Carmela Carolina Fernanda "Carmen" Russo (born 3 October 1959) is an Italian showgirl, television personality, actress, dancer, model, dance teacher and occasional singer.

Russo started her career as a model in the mid-1970s participating in several beauty contests in Italy. She first came to the public's attention for her roles in the commedia erotica all'italiana (sex comedy) genre, such as Mia moglie torna a scuola, Giovani, belle... probabilmente ricche, and Paulo Roberto Cotechiño centravanti di sfondamento.

She subsequently established herself as a television star in the 1980s with the variety shows Drive In, Risatissima, and Grand Hotel. In 2003 and 2006, she also participated in the Italian and Spanish versions of the reality show Celebrity Survivor. She won in the Spanish version Supervivientes. In 2017, she also competed in Grande Fratello VIP 2, the Italian version of Celebrity Big Brother. During her career, she released also three unsuccessful studio albums, Stars on Donna, Le canzoni di "Drive in...", and Una notte italiana, and she was also chosen many times as a model for Playmen magazine during the 1980s.

Early life 
Russo was born in Genoa, on 3 October 1959. Her father, Giovanni Russo, was a Sicilian policeman, and her mother, Emilian Giuseppina Gherardini, worked as a cashier at the cinema "Olimpia". After her parents' move to Pavullo nel Frignano, a town in the province of Modena, Emilia-Romagna and in 1969 her family return in Genoa, where she joined a dance academy. In 1973, she finished middle school and her parents entered her at the Istituto Tecnico per il Turismo, in Genoa, so that she does not give dance her full attention. With sacrifices she followed the dance lesson of Wanda Nardi, the most important dance school of the time in Genoa and she also began working as a model mannequin, and for the department store Coin, she did a poster advertisement.

Career

1974–1975: Beauty contests and night shows 
In 1974, at the age of 13, Russo won her first important beauty contest, "Miss Liguria". The previous year, Russo also won the title of "Miss Emilia" held in Pavullo nel Frignano, but it was a qualification that had no value for the national contest. By winning the victory of "Miss Liguria", Russo had the opportunity to participate in the election of "Miss Italia", but she was disqualified because was too young.

1975–1979: Rome, film appearances, and TV 
Russo and Mention decided in 1975 to move to Rome, home of the major Italian film studios. The couple arrived in Rome and moved into a tiny apartment very close to Cinecittà. With the tenacity and ambition that have always characterized Russo, every morning she stood in long queues to submit auditions for a part in a movie. Russo was immediately hired for a small part in the comedy movie Di che segno sei? with Adriano Celentano and Alberto Sordi. With this film Russo leaves for a while the stage of night clubs of the province.

In 1977, she was hired by Federico Fellini for the film La città delle donne with Marcello Mastroianni. In the movie, she shows her breasts, but was not credited. She then appeared in the crime movie Genova a mano armata as the cashier at the bar, and also made an appearance in Die linkshändige Frau (The Left-Handed Woman). The movie was a hit, especially in Germany, and was entered into the 1978 Cannes Film Festival.

Although Russo began her career as an actress, she continued to work as a showgirl in nightclubs, and in 1978, Russo hosted, with Ettore Andenna, the TV show La bustarella, which aired on Antenna 3 Lombardia. In the same year, she participated in Portobello with Enzo Tortora aired in Raiuno. Later, Russo appeared in many others films and debuted in the theater supporting Walter Chiari in Hai mai provato con l'acqua calda?. With this play, Russo won the Premio de Curtis. Due to the expansion of her career, she decided to settle permanently in Rome, which was also the home of the agency "Gymnasium".

1980–1983: Major roles, Playmen, and music 
During the summer of 1979 Russo appeared for the first time in the Italian magazine for men Playmen, at the age of nineteen. After she appeared again in the magazine in late 1980, in 1981 and two times in 1982 and 1984. She became also one of the highest paid nude models in Italy.

In 1980, she participated in the making of two films: Patrick vive ancora with Gianni Dei and La settimana bianca. During the making of La settimana bianca in the summer of 1980, she met Gianfranco D'Angelo, who helped Russo to enter the world of television. In this year, Russo also shot Le porno killers, her first role as a protagonist. In the film, Russo played a bisexual killer. In the movie, she was credited as Carmen Bizet. Her artistic breakthrough came in 1981. She left Mention and ended the job as show girl in nightclubs. Russo's next films were starring roles in the sex comedies La maestra di sci and Mia moglie torna a scuola.

At the end of 1981, Russo signed with Fontana Records for the release of a single. Her first single, "Notte senza luna", was promoted on Italian radio. In December 1981, Russo performed the B-side of the song "Stiamo insieme stasera" during the Italian TV show Blitz aired on Raiuno. The performance was shot on the Italian destroyer Ardito (D 550). Russo also performed "Stuntman", an unreleased song.

The biennium 1982–1983 for Russo was very successful. During this time, she starred in four films. Russo began with Quella peste di Pierina with Marina Marfoglia and Oreste Lionello, a few months after turning Buona come il pane. She was subsequently chosen by Pierfrancesco Pingitore for the movie Il tifoso, l'arbitro e il calciatore with Pippo Franco, Alvaro Vitali, Marisa Merlini, and Daniela Poggi and then for Giovani, belle... probabilmente ricche with Gianfranco D'Angelo, Nadia Cassini, and Edwige Fenech. 
In early 1983, Russo also released her first full-length studio album Stars on Donna, released as Carmen. The album contains cover versions of songs by Donna Summer and Giorgio Moroder.

1983–1986: Mediaset success and latest movies 

Brando Giordani and Emilio Ravel, journalists and authors, called Russo to participate in the program Colosseum, aired on Raidue. Later in 1983, Russo participated in the TV show Drive In, in which she played a sexy cashier. Russo was a primadonna in the show, where she sings dances and recites.

The theme of the show was originally sung by Cristina Moffa ("Zucchero, Zucchero"), later changed to the cover of Patty Pravo 1968 hit "La Bambola" singing by Russo. The closing credits music, "Chiammame Ambresso" written by Cristiano Malgioglio, was also sung by Russo. During the show, Russo promoted her albums Stars on Donna and Le canzoni di "Drive In...". Le canzoni di "Drive In"...''' contains selected track of songs performed by Russo in the show. From the album was also released one single, "Mi scusi signorina". In 1984, Russo also took part for the commercial of the candys "Morositas".

In the same year at the height of popularity, she took part in Ti spacco il muso, bimba with Oreste Lionello and Sergio Vasta, Paulo Roberto Cotechiño centravanti di sfondamento with Franca Valeri, and finally Cuando calienta el sol... vamos alla playa, a '60s musical-comedy film set with Claudia Vegliante and Edoardo Vianello.

In 1985, Russo returned to television, appearing in Risatissima and then in Grand Hotel on Canale 5. She also recorded the theme "Sì", an Italo disco song that had moderate success. In 1986, Russo hosted Un fantastico tragico venerdì with Lino Banfi and Massimo Boldi, which devoted Carmen as a star of classical ballet. Also for this show, she recorded the theme "Camomillati Venerdì".

 1987–1993 : Marriage, return in Rai and Spanish TV 
On 26 June 1987, Russo married choreographer and dancer  in a small church in Cassano delle Murge. After a television-show pause in 1988, performed her last film to date Rimini, Rimini – Un anno dopo with Andrea Ronco and Eva Grimaldi. With this film Russo, turned 26 films including six as the main role.

After this, Turchi suggested to leave the private channels of Silvio Berlusconi and return to RAI. Russo participated in the TV musical Io Jane, tu Tarzan directed by Enzo Trapani. The show did not achieve success despite the ballets always being elaborate. Due to the failure of her last program in 1990, Russo did only some appearances as a guest in several TV shows: Buonasera con Tino Scotti, Blitz, Black- out, Mixer, Stasera niente di nuovo, Playboy di mezzanotte, Pop Corn, A botta calda, and "Domenica, in which she was a permanent guest in the 1990–1991 season.

Later in 1991, Russo decided to leave Italy and go to Spain to conduct Vip Noche, for the  Telecinco network, for 60 episodes. The show had an unexpected success, with 41% of share every time. Also at Telecinco, Russo worked on two editions of the Sunday program Batalla de las estrellas. which Russo co-hosted with José Luis Moreno TVE for two years, as it aired at prime time on Saturdays.

 Filmography 
1975 Di che segno sei?1976 Merciless Man1977 The Left-Handed Woman1977 Nerone1979 Riavanti... Marsch!1979 Liquirizia1979 Un'ombra nell'ombra1979 I viaggiatori della sera1979 The Nurse in the Military Madhouse1980 Patrick Still Lives1980 City of Women1980 La settimana bianca1980 Le porno killers1981 Ski Mistress1981 Odd Squad1981 Mia moglie torna a scuola1982 Quella peste di Pierina1982 Buona come il pane1982 Il tifoso, l'arbitro e il calciatore1982 Giovani, belle... probabilmente ricche1983 Ti spacco il muso, bimba1983 Paulo Roberto Cotechiño centravanti di sfondamento1983 Cuando calienta el sol... vamos alla playa1988 Rimini, Rimini – Un anno dopo TV works 
1978 La bustarella on Antenna 3 Lombardia
1978 Portobello on Raiuno
1979 Sam et Sally, episode "Bedelia"
1983 Colosseum on Raidue
1983 Drive In on Italia 1
1985 Risatissima on Canale 5
1986 Un fantastico tragico venerdì on Rete 4
1986 Grand Hotel on Canale 5
1989 Io Jane, tu Tarzan on Raiuno
1990 Domenica in on Raiuno
1991 Vip Noche on Telecinco
1993 La batalla de las estrellas on Telecinco
1994 Notte italiana on Italia 7
2003 & 2012 L'isola dei famosi on Rai Due
2006 Supervivientes on Telecinco
2007 Buona domenica on Canale 5
2017 & 2021 Grande Fratello VIP on Canale 5

 Discography 

 Albums 
1983: Stars on Donna part one / Stars on Donna part two (Monkey Music Records Mr 31032)
1983: Stars on Donna (Monkey Music Records Mr 31721)
1984: Le canzoni di "Drive in..." (F1 Team 33318)
1992: Una notte italiana (Canaveral QR 1000)
1996: Macho Mambo'' EP/Mini album (Canaveral)

Singles 
1981: "Notte senza luna"
1984: "Mi scusi, signorina"
1985: "Sì"
1985: "Mai, Mai, Mai"
1986: "Camomillati Venerdì"
1987: "Bravi, Settepiù"
1989: "Io Jane tu Tarzan"
1993: "Ciù Ciù Dance" EP (Real Sound RS5410)

Notes

References

External links 

Carmen Russo Official Website  

1959 births
Living people
Italian female dancers
Italian women singers
Italian pop singers
Spanish-language singers of Italy
English-language singers from Italy
Italian film actresses
Italian Italo disco musicians
Italian dance musicians
Survivor (franchise) contestants
Participants in Italian reality television series